Glitz may refer to:

 Glitz (novel), a 1985 novel by Elmore Leonard
 Glitz (TV channel), a lifestyle TV channel for women in Latin America
 TNT Glitz (previously Glitz*), a lifestyle TV channel for women in Germany